Homunculus, Vol. 2 is the fifth studio album by Peter Frohmader, released in 1987 by Multimood.

Track listing

Personnel
Adapted from the Homunculus, Vol. 2 liner notes.
 Iva Bittova – violin
 Peter Frohmader – electronics, musical arrangement, production, engineering, mixing, cover art, design, photography
 Chris Karrer – violin, oud, alto saxophone
 Norbert Preisler – acoustic guitar
 Steffen Seithel – oboe

Release history

References

External links 
 Homunculus, Vol. 2 at Discogs (list of releases)

1987 albums
Peter Frohmader albums